Bickerstaff brainstem encephalitis is a rare inflammatory disorder of the central nervous system, first described by Edwin Bickerstaff in 1951. It may also affect the peripheral nervous system, and has features in common with both Miller Fisher syndrome and Guillain–Barré syndrome.

Signs and symptoms 
In order to diagnose Bickerstaff brainstem encephalitis, ataxia and ophthalmoplegia must be present. These are also diagnostic features of Miller Fisher syndrome, and so Bickerstaff's is only diagnosed if other features are present which exclude Miller Fisher syndrome. These may include drowsiness, coma or hyperreflexia. When the condition is defined in this way, a number of other features are commonly but not always found: among these are weakness of the limbs, the face, and/or the bulbar muscles; abnormalities of the pupils; and absent reflexes.

Like some other autoimmune diseases, the condition usually follows a minor infection, such as a respiratory tract infection or gastroenteritis.

Pathophysiology
The clinical features and course of the condition, the associated auto-antibodies against relevant antigens, and the response to treatment, all suggest that Bickerstaff brainstem encephalitis is an autoimmune disease. However, each of these criteria fails to fit a substantial proportion of patients, and there is no single test or feature which is diagnostic of Bickerstaff brainstem encephalitis. It is, therefore, possible that a proportion of cases are due to other causes, such as infection or lymphoma, but remain undiagnosed. It is also possible that there is more than one autoimmune disease that can cause an illness that would currently be diagnosed as Bickerstaff's. There is certainly overlap between Guillain–Barré syndrome, Miller Fisher syndrome and Bickerstaff brainstem encephalitis, as well as other conditions associated with anti-ganglioside antibodies such as chronic ophthalmoplegia with anti-GQ1b antibody.
and the pharyngo-cervico-brachial variant of GBS.

Diagnosis
Anti-GQ1b antibodies have been found in two-thirds of patients with this condition. This antibody is also found in almost all cases of Miller Fisher syndrome. The EEG is often abnormal, but shows only slow wave activity, which also occurs in many other conditions, and so is of limited value in diagnosis. Similarly, raised CSF protein levels and pleocytosis are frequent but non-specific. It was originally thought that raised CSF protein without pleocytosis ('albuminocytological dissociation') was a characteristic feature, as it is in Guillain–Barré syndrome, but this has not been supported in more recent work. In only 30% of cases is an MRI brain scan abnormal. Nerve conduction studies may show an axonal polyneuropathy.

Treatment
Most patients reported in the literature have been given treatments suitable for autoimmune neurological diseases, such as, plasmapheresis and/or intravenous immunoglobulin, and most have made a good recovery. The condition is too rare for controlled trials to have been undertaken.

References

External links 

Autoimmune diseases
Neurological disorders
Encephalitis